Nifiloli is an island in the Reef Islands (Latitude: 10° 10' 60 S, Longitude: 166° 13' 60 E), in the Solomon Islands province of Temotu. The estimated terrain elevation above sea level is 19 metres.  Despite its location in Melanesia, the population of the islands is Polynesian.

The language spoken on Nifiloli is Pileni language.

References

External links
 Nifiloli on Solomonislands.com.sb
 Geonames page with satellite map

Islands of the Solomon Islands
Polynesian outliers